Fasch is a surname. Notable people with the surname include:

 Carl Friedrich Christian Fasch (1736–1800), German composer and harpsichordist, son of Johann
 Johann Friedrich Fasch (1688–1758), German violinist and composer

See also
 Fasching (surname)